Xinhua railway station is a fourth-class railway station on the Shanghai–Kunming railway. It was built in 1970 and is under the jurisdiction of China Railway Guangzhou Group.

References

Railway stations in Hunan
Railway stations in Loudi
Stations on the Shanghai–Kunming Railway